United Nations Security Council Resolution 1980, adopted unanimously on April 28, 2011, after recalling previous resolutions on the situation in Côte d'Ivoire (Ivory Coast), including resolutions 1880 (2009), 1893 (2009), 1911 (2010), 1933 (2010), 1946 (2010), 1962 (2010) and 1975 (2011), the Council extended an arms embargo, ban on the trade of diamonds and targeted financial and travel sanctions on Ivorian officials until April 30, 2012.

Côte d'Ivoire's ambassador to the United Nations welcomed the adoption of the resolution to bring about "the end of the state of belligerence, from which Cote d'Ivoire has suffered over the past for months."

Resolution

Observations
The Security Council reiterated that previous resolutions authorising sanctions were taken to contribute to the stability of Côte d'Ivoire and support its peace process. It welcomed the fact that Alassane Ouattara had assumed all the responsibilities of Head of State and condemned all violations of human rights and international humanitarian law.

Acts
Acting under Chapter VII of the United Nations Charter, the arms embargo, diamond trade ban and financial and travel sanctions against selected Ivorian officials were renewed until April 30, 2012. The Council noted that the removal of the measures was conditional upon the holding of elections, the implementation of important parts of the peace process, the protection of human rights and the stability of the country. The measures would be reviewed by October 31, 2011.

The resolution urged illegal combatants to lay down their arms immediately, which would be collected by peacekeepers from the United Nations Operation in Côte d'Ivoire (UNOCI) and Ivorian government. There was also concern at the presence of mercenaries in Côte d'Ivoire, particularly from neighbouring countries; both Côte d'Ivoire and Liberia were urged to address the problem.

Finally, the Security Council extended the mandate of an expert group monitoring the implementation of sanctions against the country until April 30, 2012.

See also
 2010–2011 Ivorian crisis
 First Ivorian Civil War
 Ivorian presidential election, 2010
 List of United Nations Security Council Resolutions 1901 to 2000 (2009–2011)
 Second Ivorian Civil War

References

External links
 
Text of the Resolution at undocs.org

 1980
2011 in Ivory Coast
 1980
April 2011 events